The Town That Dreaded Sundown is a 2014 American slasher film and serves as a metafictional sequel to the 1976 film of the same name. Directed by Alfonso Gomez-Rejon in his feature-length directorial debut, the film was written by Roberto Aguirre-Sacasa and produced by Jason Blum and Ryan Murphy. The film stars Addison Timlin, Travis Tope, Spencer Treat Clark, Veronica Cartwright and Gary Cole and was one of the last films of Ed Lauter and Edward Herrmann before their deaths in October 2013 and December 2014, respectively.

The project was initially planned as remake of the 1976 film of the same name, with Gomez-Rejon directing it from a screenplay written by Aguirre-Sacasa and produced by Jason Blum through its Blumhouse Productions banner, alongside American Horror Story co-creator Ryan Murphy. However, it was conceived as a sequel, with several elements and references from the original. Filming in Texarkana began Monday, June 17, 2013 and ended in the early morning of June 20, 2013.

The Town That Dreaded Sundown was theatrically released on October 16, 2014, by Orion Pictures. The film had grossed only $120,459 in its initial release and received mixed-to-positive reviews from critics, who praised its production values, visuals and performances, but criticized its screenplay, unoriginality, and character development. As of February 2019, the film has grossed over $100k through video sales.

Plot 
On October 31, 2013, in the city of Texarkana, the local drive-in theater is hosting the Halloween annual showing of the 1976 film The Town That Dreaded Sundown, based on the true story of the Phantom Killer who murdered several people in Texarkana in 1946. Corey Holland and Jami Lerner leave to talk and kiss but The Phantom kills Corey, and tells Jami, "This is for Mary. Make them remember."

Two days before Thanksgiving, Kendra Collins-Thompson and her boyfriend, Daniel Torrens, are killed by the Phantom while having sex at a motel. The Phantom calls Jami with Corey's phone, telling her, "I'm going to do it again and again until you make them remember." She decides to tell her police escort, Deputy Foster. She is helped with her research into the killings by former classmate Nick Strain. Texas Ranger Lone Wolf Morales takes over the investigation. Jami receives an email from the Phantom and takes it to the police. Nick asks Jami to a vigil for the Phantom victims. There, a suicidal teenager shows up dressed as the Phantom and is killed, causing the townspeople to believe the murderer is actually dead. However, band members Johnny and Roy go to a junkyard to experiment sexually, where they are attacked by the real Phantom. The Phantom recreates the trombone weapon from the original film. Johnny is shot to death and Roy is stabbed.

Morales and Deputy Tillman visit Reverend Cartwright. They discovered that he sent Jami the email, but do not believe he is the Phantom. Jami learns that Charles B. Pierce's son is still alive and lives in Texarkana. On Christmas Eve, Tillman and his date are killed by the Phantom. Jami and Nick visit Charles Pierce Jr. and learn about Hank McCreedy, a sixth victim of the original Phantom whose story was forgotten. Pierce believes the new Phantom is McCreedy's grandson, because the family was angered that McCreedy's death was not remembered. McCreedy had a wife named Mary.

Lillian, Jami's grandmother, finds out that Jami was accepted into a college in California and decides to move there so Jami can go to school. Jami tells Nick she is leaving and they have sex. Nick is later killed by the Phantom. While leaving town, Jami pulls into a gas station. There, the Phantom starts firing from a window, killing Lillian and several others. Jami runs into the old Union train station and finds Nick's body. She is shot down by arrows and confronted by two Phantom Killers. One is Deputy Foster and the other is Corey, who faked his death. Foster is McCreedy's grandson. Corey tries to convince Jami they are the same: that Texarkana trapped them in roles they hated. He brags about how everyone will know what he did, and decides to kill her, but is killed by Foster who plans to kill Jami and blame the killings on her and Corey. Jami finds the gun and shoots Foster but his body is never found. Jami leaves Texarkana and moves on with her life. In the end, the Phantom's shadow is seen stalking Jami.

Cast 
 Addison Timlin as Jami Lerner
 Travis Tope as Nick Strain
 Veronica Cartwright as Lillian
 Gary Cole as Chief Deputy Tillman
 Joshua Leonard as Deputy Foster
 Edward Herrmann as Reverend Cartwright
 Anthony Anderson as "Lone Wolf" Morales
 Ed Lauter as Sheriff Underwood
 Arabella Field as Dr. Kelly
 Denis O'Hare as Charles Pierce Jr.
 Spencer Treat Clark as Corey Holland
 Morganna Bridgers as Kendra Collins
 Wes Chatham as Danny Torrens
 Jaren Mitchell as Johnny
 Kurt Krause as Roy
 Lance E. Nichols as Mayor Holdridge
 Lanee Landry as Ardele
 Colby Boothman as Paul Mason
 Bill Stinchcomb as Mr. Holland
 Danielle Harris as Townsperson
 Charles B. Pierce, Jr. as Man In Diner

Production 
When Jason Blum was asked in an interview why he wanted to remake the original film, he responded:
Ryan Murphy found the movie, brought it to me and said, "I wanna do it". I didn't find it. He brought it to me. I think he is an amazing, creative force, especially with horror. I think he thinks about horror in a really unique way. So, he pitched it to me and I really wanted to work with him. I didn't know the [original] movie. That's what got me interested in it. I have had a really good working relationship with him. And the whole point of why my business exists and why I'm such a fanatic about making movies inexpensively is that you get to do different stuff. We just wanted to try it. That's the fun thing. When you don't have a $20 million horror film, which is a typical horror movie studio budget, or a $180 million tent-pole budget, looming down at you, you can try new stuff. It may work or it may not work, but the fun is that we can try. It's a really weird movie to remake, and I really like doing weird things.

Filming 

Though the film is about Texarkana, most of the film was shot in Shreveport, Louisiana in mid-May 2013 for a six-week shoot. Some of its locals were recruited as extras. Three of those days were filmed in Texarkana. Downtown State Line Avenue was decorated with out-of-season Christmas decorations on June 12. Filming in Texarkana began Monday, June 17 and ended in the early morning of June 20. The crew then finished filming in Shreveport.

Release 
The Town That Dreaded Sundown had its first screening at the 10th Fantastic Fest in Austin, Texas on September 18–25, 2014, which director Gomez-Rejon attended, and then later at Beyond Fest in Los Angeles, California on October 4, 2014. Its international debut was at the BFI London Film Festival on October 14, 2014. Both Deadline Hollywood and Bloody Disgusting indicated that the film would be released by Orion Pictures, a long-dormant subsidiary of Metro-Goldwyn-Mayer, in select theaters on October 16, 2014. The film was then released digitally on Video on Demand through Blumhouse Productions' new BH Tilt, a new label which releases films via multi-platform.

Reception

Critical reception 
On Rotten Tomatoes, the film received a 66% approval rating based on 29 reviews with an average rating of 6/10. On Metacritic, which assigns a weighted average score out of 100 to reviews from mainstream critics, the film received an average score of 47 based on five reviews.

Variety found the film lacking and said "this tediously metatextual exercise conjures few inspired jolts of its own." Chris Tilly of IGN said the film was "ultimately, not very good." Bloody Disgusting praised the film's visuals but said "It’s unfortunate that the script can’t reach the same bar—particularly when it comes to the tired twist ending, which seems to exist simply because the filmmakers assumed audiences would expect it."

Empire Online gave the film three stars and called it "Smart, fun, mid-list horror with Scream overtones." Fangoria gave the film three out of four skulls and said, "the plot somewhat falls apart in the third act... But despite this disappointing final blow, The Town That Dreaded Sundown is still well worth a visit."

Jonathan Romney of The Guardian gave the film three stars and called it "a southern-fried Scream" and said it "proves that a brazen lack of originality doesn’t preclude inventiveness and brio." However, Benjamin Lee also writing for The Guardian gave it two stars and called it "cookie-cutter carnage."

Home media 
Image Entertainment acquired the U.S. home video distribution rights and released the film on DVD and Blu-ray exclusively at Best Buy on July 7, 2015.

References

External links 
 
 

2014 films
2014 directorial debut films
2014 horror films
2014 horror thriller films
2010s crime thriller films
2010s mystery films
2010s slasher films
Remakes of American films
American crime films
American horror thriller films
American slasher films
American mystery films
American thriller films
Blumhouse Productions films
2010s English-language films
Films scored by Ludwig Göransson
Films directed by Alfonso Gomez-Rejon
Films produced by Jason Blum
Films set in 2013
Films set in a movie theatre
Films shot in Arkansas
Films shot in Louisiana
Films shot in Texas
Horror film remakes
Orion Pictures films
Films produced by Ryan Murphy (writer)
Films with screenplays by Roberto Aguirre-Sacasa
Self-reflexive films
2010s American films